Connie Russell (May 9, 1923 – December 18, 1990) was an American singer and movie actress. Born in New York City, she appeared in seven films from the 1930s through the 1950s. She was far better known as a singer than as an actress, as her singing career was quite extensive.

Early years
Russell was the daughter of Tommy and Nina Russell, a vaudeville team. Her grandparents were also entertainers, performing as Glenroy and Russell. She attended Lawrence High School in Cedarhurst, Long Island, and the Professional Children's School in New York City.

Personal appearances
While she was still a teenager, Russell performed at venues such as the Starlight Club at New York's Waldorf-Astoria, the 500 Club in Atlantic City, New Jersey, the Famous Door, and the Paramount Theater in New York City. In late December, 1952, she appeared, along with Danny Thomas, Lou Wills, Jr., and Ray Sinatra and his orchestra, at the opening night gala of the Copa Room at the Sands Hotel and Casino in Las Vegas.

Film
By the time she was 16, Russell had signed a contract with Metro-Goldwyn-Mayer. Her film debut came in Cruisin' Down the River (1953). (Another source says that her "first socko movie appearance was in Lady Be Good" in 1941.) She played a lead role in the 1956 movie Nightmare.

Radio
On radio, Russell was the featured female singer on Let Yourself Go on CBS (1944-1945). She also appeared frequently on the syndicated Naval Air Reserve Show. In 1947, she became a network staff singer on NBC, joining Manor House Summer Party for an eight-week stint as the program's featured singer.

Television
On television, she was a regular singer on Club Embassy, Garroway at Large (1949-1951) and on The Buick-Berle Show on NBC (1953-1955). She also had success on Eddie Cantor's TV program when he liked her so well in a guest appearance that he signed her to a contract.

Probably her best known role was uncredited. She played the singing voice for the sexy Red Riding Hood on the Tex Avery directed 1943 "Red Hot Riding Hood" cartoon playing opposite the Big Bad Wolf in a 1940s nightclub. The cartoon became Avery's most well known and was voted as number 7 of The 50 Greatest Cartoons of all time.

In the cartoon, she sings a rendition of "Daddy" by Bobby Troup. The speaking voice for the character was played by Sara Berner.

Selected filmography
This Is My Love (1954)

References

External links
Connie Russell on Texaco Star Theater, from YouTube
 

American film actresses
Era Records artists
1923 births
1990 deaths
20th-century American actresses